The 1923 Spring Hill Badgers football team was an American football team that represented Spring Hill College as an independent during the 1923 college football season. Led by Edward J. "Mickey" Connors in his first season as head coach, the Badgers compiled an overall record of 1–7.

Schedule

References

Spring Hill
Spring Hill Badgers football seasons
Spring Hill Badgers football